Louise Small (born 27 March 1992) is a British long-distance runner. 

She is a life member of Aldershot, Farnham And District Athletic Club, and has been coached by Mick Woods since she first joined in 2006

In 2007, age 15, she competed for Great Britain  at the IAAF World Youth Championships. 

In 2008, Small was selected to join On Camp with Kelly, a mentoring and education program set up by Dame Kelly Holmes for aspiring young athletes.

Small is an alumni of St Mary's University where she attained a BSc in Sports Coaching Science followed by a PGCE in Primary Education and finally a Masters in Pedagogical Leadership in Physical Education and Sport

Small is currently sponsored by sports company Hoka and was previously sponsored by Nike

GB & NI Representations

Domestic competition highlights 

Small has six Senior Women's titles competing at the Hampshire Cross Country Championships, 2014, 2016, 2017, 2018, 2019, 2022.

Personal bests

References

External links 
 

Living people
1992 births
Place of birth missing (living people)
British female cross country runners
British female long-distance runners
Competitors at the 2017 Summer Universiade
20th-century British women
21st-century British women